The 1995–96 NCAA Division III men's ice hockey season began in October 1995 and concluded on March 16 of the following year. This was the 23rd season of Division III college ice hockey.

Regular season

Season tournaments

Standings

Note: Mini-game are not included in final standings

1996 NCAA Tournament

Note: * denotes overtime period(s)

See also
 1995–96 NCAA Division I men's ice hockey season
 1995–96 NCAA Division II men's ice hockey season

References

External links

 
NCAA